This is a list of Mexico's 37 most-wanted drug lords as published by Mexican federal authorities on 23 March 2009. According to a BBC Mundo Mexico report, the 37 drug lords "have jeopardized Mexico national security." As of 8 January 2016, 25 drug lords had been captured, eight had been killed and four remained fugitives. As of 2022, the single remaining fugitive of the 37 most-wanted drug lords is Ismael "El Mayo" Zambada who has never been arrested and incarcerated.

The list of drug lords is grouped by their drug cartels.  Mexico has offered up to 30 million pesos for the capture of each of the fugitives. The United States also offers rewards for two of them. 

The most-wanted of the 37 drug lords was Joaquín Guzmán Loera, for whom Mexican and U.S. governments offered a total bounty of US$7 million. He was captured on 22 February 2014 in Mazatlán, Sinaloa, where he was staying at a hotel. He escaped on 11 July 2015 through a 1.5 kilometer long tunnel from his cell in the Mexican maximum security prison but was recaptured by Mexican Marines following a gun battle on 8 January 2016. As of 8 January 2016, 25 drug lords had been captured, eight had been killed and four remained fugitives.

Chronology
As of 18 January 2011, Mexico had captured or killed 20 of the 37 in the most-wanted list. The 21 June 2011 arrest of José de Jesús Méndez Vargas, a.k.a. "El Chango", brought the total to twenty-one captured or killed. On 4 November 2011, Francisco Hernández García was captured. A leader of the Zetas drug cartel, Raúl Hernández Lechuga was captured on 12 December 2011. On 26 September 2012, Iván Velázquez Caballero was captured by Mexican security forces. The 7 October 2012 killing of Heriberto Lazcano brought this total to 25 captured or killed so far.

On 15 July 2013, Miguel Treviño Morales was apprehended by the Mexican Marines in a town called Anáhuac, Nuevo León, near the border of the state of Tamaulipas,. Then, the 27 January 2014 apprehension of Dionisio Loya Plancarte, a.k.a. "El Tío" left the Mexican government with 10 fugitives still on the loose. On 23 June 2014, Fernando Sánchez Arellano was arrested by soldiers of the Mexican Army and federal agents of the Procuraduría General de la República (PGR) at the La Mesa borough of Tijuana, Baja California. On 1 October 2014 Héctor Beltrán Leyva was arrested by the Mexican Army  inside a restaurant in San Miguel de Allende, Guanajuato. On 9 October 2014, Vicente Carrillo Fuentes was arrested by Mexican authorities in Torreón (Coahuila). On 27 February 2015, Servando Gómez Martínez, the leader of the Knights Templar cartel, was arrested by Mexican security forces in Morelia, Michoacán. On 4 March 2015, Omar Treviño Morales was captured inside a residence in Fuentes del Valle, an upper-class neighborhood in San Pedro Garza García, Nuevo León, by the Federal Police and the Mexican Army. On 8 January 2016, Mexican Marines captured Joaquín Guzmán Loera after a heavy firefight in the city of Los Mochis, Sinaloa, bringing the total captured or killed to 33.

Grouped by drug cartels
Mexico offered up to 30 million pesos (about 1.45 million U.S. dollars in 2021) for each of the following:

Beltrán-Leyva Cartel
 Arturo Beltrán Leyva, a.k.a. "Jefe de Jefes", "El Barbas", "El Botas Blancas", "La Muerte" – Killed on 16 December 2009
 Héctor Beltrán Leyva, a.k.a. "El Ingeniero", "El H", "El General" – Captured on 1 October 2014 – Died on 18 November 2018
 Sergio Villarreal Barragán, a.k.a. "El Grande" "Comeniños", King Kong – Captured on 13 September 2010
 Edgar Valdez Villarreal, a.k.a. "La Barbie", "El Comandante", "El Güero" – Captured on 31 August 2010

La Familia Michoacana/Knights Templar Cartel
 Nazario Moreno González, a.k.a. "El Chayo", "El Doctor", "El Más Loco" – Killed on 9 March 2014
 Servando Gómez Martínez, a.k.a. "El Profe", "La Tuta" – Captured on 27 February 2015
 José de Jesús Méndez Vargas, a.k.a. "El Chango" – Captured on 21 June 2011
 Dionisio Loya Plancarte, a.k.a. "El Tío" – Captured on 27 January 2014

Gulf Cartel
 Jorge Eduardo Costilla Sánchez, a.k.a. "El Coss" – Captured on 12 September 2012
 Ezequiel Cárdenas Guillén, a.k.a. "Tony Tormenta" – Killed on 5 November 2010
 Sigifredo Nájera Talamantes, a.k.a. "El Canicón" – Captured on 23 March 2009 – Died on 7 September 2015
 Sergio Enrique Ruiz Tlapanco, a.k.a. "El Tlapa" – Captured on 8 September 2009

Juárez Cartel
 Vicente Carrillo Fuentes, a.k.a. "El Viceroy", "El General" – Captured on 9 October 2014
 Vicente Carrillo Leyva, a.k.a. "El Ingeniero" – Captured on 3 April 2009
 Juan Pablo Ledezma, a.k.a. "El JL".

Sinaloa Cartel
 Joaquín Guzmán Loera, a.k.a. "El Chapo" – Captured on 22 February 2014 – Escaped on 11 July 2015 – Recaptured on 8 January 2016
 Ismael Zambada García, a.k.a. "El Mayo", "El M-Z", "El Padrino"
 Ignacio Coronel Villarreal, a.k.a. "El Nacho" – Killed on 29 July 2010
 Juan José Esparragoza Moreno, a.k.a. "El Azul" – Allegedly died on 7 June 2014
 Vicente Zambada Niebla, a.k.a. "El Vicentillo" – Captured on 19 March 2009

Tijuana Cartel
 Teodoro García Simental, a.k.a. "El Teo", "El Lalo", "El Alamo", "El K-1", "El Tres Letras" – Captured on 12 January 2010
 Fernando Sánchez Arellano, a.k.a. "El Ingeniero", "El Alineador" – Captured on 23 June 2014
 Benjamín Arellano Félix a.k.a. “El Min”,  – Captured on 9 March 2002  
 Ramón Arellano Félix a.k.a. “El Commandante Món”  “Món”  “Colores”  – Killed on 10 February 2002   (Gunshot wound)

Los Zetas
 Heriberto Lazcano Lazcano, a.k.a. "El Lazca", "Z-3", "El Verdugo" (English: "The Executioner"), "El Bronce", "El Pitirijas", "Licenciado" – Killed on 7 October 2012
 Miguel Ángel Treviño Morales, a.k.a. "Z-40" ("40", "Cuarenta", "Comandante 40") – Captured on 15 July 2013
 Omar Treviño Morales, a.k.a. "Z-42" – Captured on 4 March 2015
 Iván Velázquez Caballero, a.k.a. "El Talibán", "Z-50" – Captured on 26 September 2012
 Gregorio Sauceda Gamboa, a.k.a. "El Goyo", "Metro-2", "Caramuela" – Captured on 30 April 2009
 Alberto Pineda Villa, a.k.a. "El Borrado" – Killed on 12 September 2009
 Marco Antonio Pineda Villa, a.k.a. "El MP" – Killed on 12 September 2009
 Héctor Huerta Ríos, a.k.a. "La Burra", "El Junior" – Captured on 25 March 2009 – Killed on 4 July 2019
 Ricardo Almanza Morales, a.k.a. "El Gori I" – Killed on 4 December 2009
 Eduardo Almanza Morales, a.k.a. "El Gori II"
 Raymundo Almanza Morales, a.k.a. "El Gori III" – Captured on 22 May 2009
 Flavio Méndez Santiago, a.k.a. "El Amarillo" – Captured on 18 January 2011
 Sergio Peña Solís, a.k.a. "El Concord", "El Colosio" – Captured on 14 March 2009
 Raúl Lucio Hernández Lechuga, a.k.a. "El Lucky" – Captured 12 December 2011

Sortable table

See also

 List of fugitives from justice who disappeared
 Mexican Drug War
 Timeline of the Mexican Drug War

Policing
 Rurales
 Federales
 Grupo de Operaciones Especiales (Mexico)
 Mérida Initiative
 Attorney General of Mexico (Procuraduría General de la República)

General
 Crime in Mexico
 The World's 10 Most Wanted Fugitives

References

External links
Original Rewards Press Release by PROCURADURIA GENERAL DE LA REPUBLICA, dated 23 March 2009.
Mug shots and bio of Joaquín Archivaldo Guzmán Loera

Sinaloa Cartel traffickers
Organized crime-related lists
 
 Mexico
Mexican drug war
Mexican drug traffickers
Mexican money launderers
Mexican crime bosses
Most wanted lists
Mexico crime-related lists